Grindelia havardii, or Havard's gumweed, is a North American species of flowering plants in the family Asteraceae. It is native to the south-central United States, in the states of Texas and New Mexico.

Grindelia havardii grows in open, sunny sites on rocky slopes and in alluvial deposits. It is a perennial herb sometimes as much as 150 cm (5 feet) tall. The plant usually produces numerous flower heads in crowded, flat-topped arrays. Each head has 18-25 ray flowers, surrounding a large number of tiny disc flowers.

References

External links
photo of herbarium specimen at Missouri Botanical Garden, collected in Texas in 1931, isotype of Grindelia havardii 

havardii
Plants described in 1934
Flora of New Mexico
Flora of Texas